The 2018 Station Square Derailment happened in Pittsburgh, Pennsylvania, United States, on the afternoon of August 5, 2018. The incident composed of 46 double-stack intermodal containers, and 23 well cars. The train was a Norfolk Southern, carrying Listerine and Pampers, and was traveling at approximately 25  MPH. The cars fell onto the Port Authority of Allegheny County tracks, blocking the line. Nobody was injured, although the accident caused $1.8M in damage. The accident was caught on video.

An investigation by the U.S. Federal Railroad Administration (FRA) agreed with an initial assessment by Norfolk Southern Railroad that a defect in the rails caused the accident. A rail inspection performed approximately 3 weeks earlier failed to detect the defect. The investigation faulted Norfolk Southern's contractor Sperry Rail Service for failing to detect the defect.

Cleanup and removal 
The cleanup and removal started right after the derailment and ended by August 8, when Port Authority had removed all of the 46 containers.

Train 
The train involved in the incident was heading from New Jersey to Chicago. It was carrying household items. The train was 7,687 feet (1.46 miles) long, and had three locomotives. It weighed 4,838 tons.

References 

Derailments in the United States

Accidents and incidents involving Norfolk Southern Railway